Līvāni Station is a railway station serving the town of Līvāni in the Latgale region of south-easstern Latvia. It is located on the Riga–Daugavpils Railway.

References 

Railway stations in Latvia
Railway stations opened in 1861